Push the Blues Away is a collaborative studio album by Australian blues musicians Josh Teskey and Ash Grunwald, released on 13 November 2020 through Ivy League Records.

The album was recorded to analogue tape and features a mix of original songs by both artists, alongside two covers.

Background and release
The album was inspired by both artists' love of blues and mutual admiration for each other's work. The project commenced after the duo began an impromptu jam of "The Sky Is Crying" during downtime between takes filming a video clip for Grunwald's "Ain't My Problem"; a track which featured the Teskey Brothers. Grunwald said "Somebody filmed our little jam, and it became the seed of a great idea: Why don't we do an acoustic blues album? No bells and whistles, something from the heart. This album was made how any good blues album should be in my opinion; Spontaneously and instinctively."

The album was recorded in five days at The Teskey Brothers' studio in Warrandyte.

The eight-track album features a handful of songs written by Teskey and Grunwald respectively, along with two covers – Son House's "Preachin' Blues" and the aforementioned "The Sky Is Crying".

Singles
On 23 August 2020, Teskey and Grunwald premiered the song "Thinking 'Bout Myself" on ABC's The Sound. The song was digitally released the following day.

The album's second single "Hungry Heart" was written by Josh Teskey and released on 2 October 2020. Teskey said of the track "After spending many years running away, attempting to push the blues away, 'Hungry Heart' is the happy ending, the moment when I stopped running away and found and accepted love. The song is basically the story of spending your whole life searching for love and finding it. The hungry heart is fed! I dedicate this song to my incredible life partner Hannah and our daughter Ayva."

Critical reception

Josh Leeson from Newcastle Star said "Subtly is the key to the album. With just acoustic guitar and harmonica, Teskey's raw vocal is left to deliver the colour and feeling. Grunwald, too, produces some of his finest work in years. "

Awards and nominations

AIR Awards

! 
|-
! scope="row"| 2021
| Push the Blues Away 
| Best Independent Blues and Roots Album or EP
| 
| 
|}

ARIA Music Awards

! 
|-
| scope="row"| 2021|| Push the Blues Away (with Ash Grunwald ) || ARIA Award for Best Blues and Roots Album || 
|

Track listing

Personnel
Adapted from the album's liner notes.

Musicians
 Josh Teskey – writing , vocals 
 Ash Grunwald – writing , vocals 
Other musicians
 Son House – writing 
 Elmore James – writing 
 Morgan Robinson – writing 
 Clarence Lewis – writing

Technical
 Sam Teskey – recording, mixing 
 Joe Carra – mastering

Artwork
 Tom Dunphy – photography
 Sebastian White – design and illustration

Charts

References

2020 albums
Ash Grunwald albums
Josh Teskey albums
Collaborative albums